Shankarrao Thorat (12 December 1909 – September 1983) was an Indian wrestler. He competed in the men's freestyle bantamweight at the 1936 Summer Olympics.

References

External links
 

1909 births
1983 deaths
Indian male sport wrestlers
Olympic wrestlers of India
Wrestlers at the 1936 Summer Olympics
Place of birth missing